Ramzy Yussif (born 6 July 2000) is a professional Ghanaian footballer who plays as a midfielder for New Edubiase United.

Club career

HNK Gorica
Yussif signed for HNK Gorica on 31 August 2018.

References

External links
 
 

2000 births
Living people
Ghanaian footballers
Association football midfielders
Ghanaian expatriate footballers
Expatriate footballers in Croatia
Expatriate footballers in Belarus
HNK Gorica players
FC Energetik-BGU Minsk players